is a character appearing in Sega's Sonic the Hedgehog franchise. Shadow was created by Takashi Iizuka and Shiro Maekawa and first appeared in Sonic Adventure 2 (2001). Although this was intended to be his only appearance, Shadow proved so popular among fans that developer Sonic Team decided to include him in Sonic Heroes (2003). Shadow has since featured in numerous entries in the franchise, including the spin-off Shadow the Hedgehog (2005). He also appears in Sonic film and television adaptations, comics, and merchandise.

Within the Sonic franchise's fictional universe, Shadow is an artificial, anthropomorphic black hedgehog created 50 years before titular character, Sonic the Hedgehog was born, by Professor Gerald Robotnik, the grandfather of series antagonist Doctor Eggman. After witnessing the murder of his best friend Maria, Shadow vows to keep his promise to her that he would protect the world from danger. As an antihero, Shadow has good intentions but will do whatever it takes to accomplish his goals, putting him at odds with series protagonist Sonic the Hedgehog. Shadow shares many attributes with Sonic and controls similarly in games, but is distinguished by his use of vehicles and firearms.

The idea for Shadow originated during the development of the original Sonic Adventure, with Iizuka and Maekawa ensuring he would be a subtle, "cool" character players could care about. Although Shadow is one of the series' most popular characters and was named one of the greatest video game characters by Guinness World Records in 2011, he has proven divisive among video game journalists. Some have praised his role in Sonic Adventure 2 and his levels' preservation of the Sonic theme, but others have criticized his dark characterization. The Shadow game sold well, but received generally unfavorable reviews.

Description
Shadow is an anthropomorphic black hedgehog appearing in Sega's Sonic the Hedgehog series of platform games and its various spin-offs. He first appeared in the 2001 installment Sonic Adventure 2, the final Sonic game released for a Sega Dreamcast. His roles in the games vary. Some, such as the main series games Sonic Adventure 2, Sonic Heroes (2003), and Sonic the Hedgehog (2006) feature him as a major playable character, and he is the protagonist of the spin-off Shadow the Hedgehog (2005) and a downloadable content (DLC) package for Sonic Forces (2017). Others, such as the anniversary game Sonic Generations (2011), limit him to a non-playable role.

In the games, Shadow is depicted as a mysterious, sharp-witted, and brooding antihero. While his ultimate goal is to protect the world from danger, he dislikes humanity, and once he has set a goal, he does whatever it takes to accomplish it. This often causes him to take risks without thinking them through and puts him at odds with series protagonist Sonic the Hedgehog. Although a loner, Shadow collaborates with treasure hunter Rouge the Bat and robot E-123 Omega in games such as Sonic Heroes, Sonic the Hedgehog (2006), and Sonic Forces. Shadow allies with Sonic in some games, but also does so with Doctor Eggman in Sonic Adventure 2 and Shadow the Hedgehog.

Shadow shares many similarities with Sonic. Visually, GameSpot Ben Stahl described Shadow as "an evil version of Sonic himself—similar in appearance, but with darker skin, more angled eyes, and a fearsome snarl instead of Sonic's trademark grin." GamesRadar+ Justin Leeper said that if Sonic was Superman, then Shadow would be his Batman. The characters control similarly in games, as both share skills and the ability to run at great speeds. Shadow has unique attributes in some games, such as his uses of firearms and vehicles in Shadow the Hedgehog and Sonic the Hedgehog, respectively. He can also use the Chaos Emeralds to perform "Chaos Control"—allowing him to distort time—and create weapons like spears. Like Sonic, Shadow can transform into a "Super" form giving him special powers.

Development
Shadow was created by Takashi Iizuka and Shiro Maekawa, who respectively served as director and writer of Sonic Adventure 2. According to Iizuka, the idea for Shadow originated during development of the original Sonic Adventure (1998), when Sonic Team intended to introduce a rival for Sonic in a potential sequel. Although they rarely discussed the idea, the staff continually thought about it. Eventually, while work on Sonic Adventure 2 progressed, Sonic Team found use in Shadow when they laid out the game's "good vs. evil" plotlines. Shadow's name at the beginning of development was "Terios" ("reflection of"), referencing his role as Sonic's doppelganger.

Sonic Team tasked Maekawa with developing Shadow, whom they wanted to look just as "cool" as Sonic. Maekawa settled on the design of a black hedgehog, but struggled coming up with his personality. One night, while he brainstormed lines for a scene in which Sonic confronts Shadow for impersonating him, Maekawa came up with Shadow's first line: "Hmph, aren't you the fake one here?" As part of shaping his subtle character, Maekawa envisioned Shadow would refer to himself using the more humble Japanese pronoun boku (僕). Iizuka made sure that Shadow's introduction also brought new events to the game, as he wanted players to care about the character.

Sonic Adventure 2 was intended to be Shadow's only appearance, but his popularity among fans led to him returning in 2003's Sonic Heroes. Additionally, Sonic Team wanted to feature Shadow in a spin-off game. By 2005, Sonic Team was interested in developing a high-speed shooter game. They chose to focus on Shadow—whom they felt would provide "the perfect venue... to try our hand at this genre"—leading to the development of Shadow the Hedgehog. Series co-creator Yuji Naka hoped Shadow would lead to a spin-off series about the character. When developing Shadow's design and world, Sonic Team was influenced by films such as Underworld (2003), Constantine (2005), and those in the Terminator series.

The team abandoned Shadow's shooting gameplay when working on Sonic the Hedgehog in 2006. Instead, director Shun Nakamura emphasized combat to differentiate his gameplay from that of Sonic's; while Sonic was designed for speedy platforming, Shadow was designed for fighting enemies. After Sonic and the Black Knight (2009), Shadow did not appear as a playable character in a Sonic platformer for some time, until the release of Sonic Forces in 2017. Nakamura explained that Sonic Team brought Shadow back for Sonic Forces so it would appeal to fans of the Adventure games, as the character is "extremely popular" among that group. Iizuka has commented that another Shadow-oriented spin-off is a possibility.

In Japan, Kōji Yusa voices Shadow. Shadow's English voice actor has changed several times. David Humphrey was the first to assume the role, but was replaced by Jason Griffith, who voiced Shadow and Sonic in the English dub of the anime series Sonic X (2003–2006), for Shadow the Hedgehog in 2005. Kirk Thornton has voiced Shadow since 2010, starting with Sonic Free Riders.

Character biography
Within the Sonic series' fictional universe, Shadow the Hedgehog is a clone of Sonic the Hedgehog created by Professor Gerald Robotnik through genetic engineering as part of an experiment to cure his granddaughter Maria from a deadly illness. While Shadow and Maria formed a strong bond, the government deemed him a threat. Shadow was placed in suspended animation and a military organization, the Guardian Units of Nations (G.U.N.), killed Maria as Shadow tried to protect her. Maria's death traumatized Shadow, who vowed to keep his promise to her that he would protect the world from danger. In Sonic Adventure 2, Gerald's grandson, Doctor Eggman, learns of Shadow and revives him as part of a plan to conquer the world and defeat Sonic the Hedgehog. Shadow agrees to help Eggman and frames Sonic for their evil deeds. However, Shadow eventually allies himself with Sonic to prevent the world's destruction after he remembers the promise he made to Maria. However, he is unable to handle the power of all seven Chaos Emeralds in a Super state as well as Sonic, and plummets to Earth from space after the final boss fight.

Shadow is presumed deceased until Sonic Heroes; Rouge the Bat discovers him alive in Eggman's base during a search. He remembers nothing except his name and Maria's death, and teams up with Rouge and E-123 Omega to find Eggman and learn of his past. In Shadow the Hedgehog, Shadow, still experiencing amnesia, becomes caught in a three-way war between Eggman, G.U.N., and the Black Arms, an alien army led by Black Doom. Shadow can choose to help G.U.N., Sonic and his friends, Eggman, or the Black Arms. At the end of the game, Shadow recovers from his amnesia and learns the truth about his past, including that Gerald created him using Black Doom's blood and Black Doom uses that to control him, but Shadow stands up to him and ultimately defeats him. After the battle, Shadow chooses to put the past behind him and move on, and in Sonic the Hedgehog is depicted as having joined G.U.N.

Reception and impact
Shadow quickly proved popular among players of Sonic Adventure 2, contributing to his return in later games. Additionally, responses to his introduction were favorable; critics considered his levels in Sonic Adventure 2 among the game's highlights. GameSpot Shane Satterfield wrote Shadow's levels were exciting and helped preserve the general theme of Sonic games, and wished they had been more plentiful. Nintendo Life Mark Reece similarly felt Shadow's levels successfully adapted the Sonic formula to 3D. However, despite strong sales, the 2005 Shadow game received generally unfavorable reviews and, according to Official Nintendo Magazine Thomas East, tarnished the character's reputation.

Reviews for Shadow the Hedgehog criticized numerous aspects of the character, such as his controls, use of firearms, and characterization. Game Informer Matt Helgeson decried Shadow as a character who lacked personality and mocked his "ridiculous" and "laughable" Clint Eastwood rasp, while GameSpy Patrick Klepek felt the game was proof the Sonic series had jumped the shark. Similarly, 1UP.com Shane Bettenhausen compared Shadow to Poochie, a character from The Simpsons episode "The Itchy & Scratchy & Poochie Show" (1997) symbolic of creating a new character simply to boost a flagging series. Klepek thought guns made sense for Shadow's character but did not have a compelling use in the game, and expressed hope Sonic Team would "[bury] him alongside the same graves as the third-tier of characters from Knuckles' Chaotix." Critics reviewing the 2006 Sonic the Hedgehog considered Shadow's gameplay slightly better than that of Sonic's but felt it did not add enough to the experience, while Den of Geek Chris Freiberg wrote the Shadow DLC for Sonic Forces added some replay value to a game he criticized for its short length.

Writers have called Shadow—both the game and the character—an ill-advised attempt to bring a sense of maturity to the Sonic series. Indeed, IGN Levi Buchanan and 1UPs Jeremy Parish considered him one of the series' biggest problems; Parish wrote that of the unnecessary Sonic characters Sega should retire, Shadow was the most in need of it. Numerous video game journalists have mockingly described the character as "edgy", internet slang referring to someone who exhibits disconcerting behavior in an effort to impress others. In 2010, DeviantArt user "cmara" released a webcomic depicting Shadow in a romantic relationship with Shrek, the title character of the DreamWorks film series. According to Kotaku Nathan Grayson, the comic paired the two because "if Shrek was the big screen embodiment of nu-millennium toilet garbage, Shadow the Hedgehog—with his hilariously unfitting blend of guns and angst in a colorful world of fast animals in clown shoes—was his video game bride. Both tried to act like they were too cool for 'kid stuff.' Too sophisticated, too edgy. They were made for each other—and approximately one billion people between the ages of 12 and 34."

Shadow is a divisive Sonic character. Some, such as East, who ranked him one of the series' best characters, praise him for his role in Sonic Adventure 2; Game Informer Brian Shea called Shadow a "fun equal" to Sonic who delivered the series' traditional sense of speed, and Polygon Allegra Frank said he is a fan-favorite. "For others," wrote Kotaku Mike Fahey, Shadow "signifies the looming death of a beloved series." Fahey felt Shadow's self-titled game was when the Sonic franchise lost its identity, and dismissed those who argued in favor of his role in Sonic Adventure 2. Jim Sterling, writing for GamesRadar+, ranked Shadow among the series' worst characters, arguing he lost his relevance over time and calling him "the ultimate example of a good idea gone rotten." Brian Shea from Game Informer included Shadow in a similar list, whom observed "Shadow's brooding "tortured soul" personality wore on a lot of fans quickly..." In a more positive write-up, Fanbyte's Kenneth Shepard argued Shadow's characterization was more complex than most characters in the series, but recent iterations have leaned harder into a one-dimensional "edgelord" archetype. Despite this, in 2005 Naka said Sonic Team had determined Shadow was the series' most popular character excluding Sonic himself, a finding reaffirmed in a 2009 Sega poll. In 2011, Guinness World Records named Shadow among the 50 greatest video game characters of all time.

In other media
Outside the video game series, Shadow appears in the anime series Sonic X, which adapts the story of the Sonic Adventure games and also appears in the animation Sonic Boom (TV series) and Sonic Prime. The original Japanese cast from the games reprised their roles, while Jason Griffith voiced Shadow in the English dub by 4Kids Entertainment. In the Sonic Boom  (2014–2017) spin-off franchise, Shadow appears in the 2014 games Sonic Boom: Rise of Lyric for the Wii U and Sonic Boom: Shattered Crystal for the Nintendo 3DS, and the episodes "It Takes a Village to Defeat a Hedgehog" and both parts entitled "Eggman: The Video Game", voiced by Kirk Thornton, and usually appears as a rival to Team Sonic. Ian Hanlin voices Shadow in Sonic Prime. After Sonic inadvertently opens the path to the Paradox Prism for Eggman, Shadow has a vague vision of the universe's shatter and tries to prevent it but fails, he manages to escape it using Chaos Control and is trapped in the void between Shatterspaces. Shadow also appears in the Sonic the Hedgehog comic books published by Archie Comics and IDW Publishing, and his likeness has been used in Sonic merchandise. Shadow made his live-action debut in a non-speaking cameo appearance in the mid-credits scene of the 2022 film Sonic the Hedgehog 2.

Notes

References

External links
 Official character profiles on Sonic Central and Sonic-City (archived)
 Shadow at Sonic Channel (in Japanese)
 Shadow the Hedgehog on Sonic Retro, for character stats and additional plot information

Animal characters in video games
Anthropomorphic video game characters
Cryonically preserved characters in video games
Fictional characters who can manipulate time
Fictional characters with amnesia
Fictional characters with post-traumatic stress disorder
Fictional government agents
Fictional hedgehogs
Fictional henchmen in video games
Genetically engineered characters in video games
Male characters in video games
Sega antagonists
Sega protagonists
Sonic the Hedgehog characters
Video game bosses
Video game characters introduced in 2001
Video game characters who can move at superhuman speeds
Video game characters who can teleport
Video game characters with slowed ageing
Video game mascots
Vigilante characters in video games
Villains in animated television series